Marcin Mientki (born 1 July 1976) is a Polish cyclist. He competed in the men's team sprint at the 2000 Summer Olympics.

References

External links
 

1976 births
Living people
Polish male cyclists
Olympic cyclists of Poland
Cyclists at the 2000 Summer Olympics
Sportspeople from Toruń